Nicor Gas is an energy company headquartered in Naperville, Illinois.  Its largest subsidiary, Nicor Gas, is a natural gas distribution company. Founded in 1954, the company serves more than two million customers in a service territory that encompasses most of the northern third of Illinois, excluding the city of Chicago. Nicor Gas has  of pipelines.

AGL Resources announced its acquisition of Nicor in December 2010; the acquisition closed the following year.
Southern Company announced its acquisition of AGL in 2016.

See also
 Fixed bill

References

External links and sources
Nicor Gas website

Natural gas companies of the United States
Natural gas pipeline companies
Energy infrastructure in Illinois
Companies based in Naperville, Illinois
American companies established in 1954
Energy companies established in 1954
Non-renewable resource companies established in 1954
1954 establishments in Illinois
2011 mergers and acquisitions
Natural gas pipelines in Illinois
Nicor Gas Login